Diasemiodes is a genus of moths of the family Crambidae.

Species
Diasemiodes eudamidasalis (Druce, 1899)
Diasemiodes janassialis (Walker, 1859)
Diasemiodes nigralis (Fernald, 1892)
Diasemiodes picalis

References

Spilomelinae
Crambidae genera
Taxa named by Eugene G. Munroe